The 1947 Delaware State Hornets football team represented Delaware State College—now known as Delaware State University—as a member of Colored Intercollegiate Athletic Association (CIAA) in the 1947 college football season. The Hornets compiled a 4–4 record under coach Tom Conrad.

Schedule

Notes

References

Delaware State
Delaware State Hornets football seasons
Delaware State Hornets football